Hai Ou may refer to:
HMS Sansovino (F162)
Dvora class fast patrol boat